These are the Oricon number one albums of 1997, per the Oricon Albums Chart.

Chart history

References

1997 record charts
Lists of number-one albums in Japan
1997 in Japanese music